Benjamin Dube (23 January 1962) is a South African gospel recording artist who rose to fame in the early 80s. Over the years he has released several albums which have reached gold and platinum status in the South African music rankings. Dube is also a lead pastor of the High Praise Centre in Voslorus, east of Johannesburg.

Early years
Coming from a religious family, Dube's music interest was sparked at an early age. He started singing gospel music together with his family as a seven-year-old.

Discography
 Celebration (1994)
 I feel like going on (2000)
 High Praise Explosion (2002)
 for every mountain...thank you (2004)
 You Bless Me Still (2005)
 In His Presence (2007)
 Worship In His Presence (2010)
 Healing In His Presence (2012)
 Renewal In His Presence (2014)
 Sanctified In His Presence (2015)
 Victorious In His Presence (2017)
 Glory In His Presence (2019)
 Looking back

References 

South African gospel singers
1962 births
Living people